Matthew W. Finkin (born 7 April 1943) is one of the leading labor law scholars in the United States. He co-authors the foundational textbook Labor Law: Cases and Materials and is co-editor of the international journal, the Comparative Labor Law & Policy Journal.

Finkin graduated from Ohio Wesleyan University, then with an LL.B. from New York University, an LL.M. from Yale University. He worked at the Southern Methodist University from 1976 to 1988, before moving to the University of Illinois in 1988.

Publications
Books
Labor Law (15th edn Foundation 2011) with Archibald Cox, Derek Bok, and Robert A. Gorman

Articles
Statement before the Commission on the Future of Worker-Management Relations

References

External links
Matthew Finkin's homepage

Labour law